The 1990 NCAA Division III women's basketball tournament was the ninth annual tournament hosted by the NCAA to determine the national champion of Division III women's collegiate basketball in the United States.

Hope defeated St. John Fisher in the championship game, 65–63, to claim the Flying Dutchmen's first Division III national title.

The championship rounds were hosted by Hope College in Holland, Michigan.

Bracket

Elite Eight

All-tournament team
 Dina Disney, Hope
 Holly VandenBerg, Hope
 Susan Heidt, St. John Fisher
 Michelle Skovrinski, St. John Fisher
 Dortha Ford, Heidelberg

See also
 1990 NCAA Division I women's basketball tournament
 1990 NCAA Division II women's basketball tournament
 1990 NCAA Division III men's basketball tournament
1990 NAIA women's basketball tournament

References

 
NCAA Division III women's basketball tournament
1990 in sports in Michigan